Alpine is a city in the county seat of Brewster County, Texas, United States. The population was 5,905 at the 2010 census. The university, hospital, library, and retail make Alpine the center of the sprawling  but wide open Big Bend area (combined population only 12,500) including Brewster, Presidio, and Jeff Davis counties.

History

The area had been a campsite for cattlemen tending their herds between 1878 and the spring of 1882, when a town of tents was created by railroad workers and their families. Because the section of the railroad was called Osborne, that was the name of the small community for a brief time. The railroad needed access to water from springs owned by brothers named Daniel and Thomas Murphy, so it entered into an agreement with the Murphys to change the name of the section and settlement to Murphyville in exchange for a contract to use the spring. In November 1883, the Murphys registered a plat for the town of Murphyville with the county clerk of Presidio County.

The town's name was changed to Alpine on February 3, 1888, following a petition by its residents. At this time, a description of the town mentioned a dozen houses, three saloons, a hotel and rooming house, a livery stable, a butcher shop, and a drugstore, which also housed the post office.

Alpine grew very slowly until Sul Ross State Normal College (now Sul Ross State University) was opened in 1920. The development of Big Bend National Park in the 1930s and '40s spurred further growth. The population was estimated at only 396 in 1904, but by 1927, it had risen to 3,000. The 1950 census reported Alpine's population at 5,256, and a high of roughly 6,200 was reached by 1976. In 1990, the population was down to 5,637. In 2000, the population grew modestly to 5,786 and 5,905 by 2010.

The town was always small enough that no one insisted on tearing down old buildings to make parking lots, and it is still too small to interest most big-box store chains. The Holland Hotel, built during a brief mercury mining boom, was designed by Henry Trost, a distinguished regional architect. Today, it helps to anchor a traditional downtown of early 20th-century buildings still occupied by family-owned retailers and restaurants.

Geography
The town sits on a high plateau, in the Chihuahua Desert, with the Davis Mountains to the north and the Chisos Mountains to the south. Outcrops of ancient volcanic rocks spread to the northwest. Other layers of rocks have been exposed over time as the mountains were forced up and then eroded. The high elevation cools the desert air in the evenings.

Climate
In the winters, ample sunshine usually warms the days, though the nights can be chilly due to the  elevation. In the summer, the fierce sun causes hot days, pleasantly relieved in the evening by the same high elevation. According to the Köppen climate classification system, Alpine has a semiarid climate, BSk on climate maps.

Coordinates: 
Elevation:

Demographics

2020 census

As of the 2020 United States census, there were 6,035 people, 2,886 households, and 1,414 families residing in the city.

2000 census
As of the 2000 census, 5,786 people, 2,429 households, and 1,435 families resided in the city. The population density was 1,416.5 people per square mile (547.5/km2). The 2,852 housing units averaged 698.2 per square mile (269.9/km2). The racial makeup of the city was 79.19% White, 1.33% African American, 0.81% Native American, 0.45% Asian, 0.07% Pacific Islander, 15.45% from other races, and 2.70% from two or more races. Hispanics or Latinos of any race were 50.31% of the population.

Of the 2,429 households, 28.7% had children under the age of 18 living with them, 43.7% were married couples living together, 11.8% had a female householder with no husband present, and 40.9% were not families. About 34.3% of all households were made up of individuals, and 13.1% had someone living alone who was 65 years of age or older. The average household size was 2.34 and the average family size was 3.04.

In the city, the population was distributed as 24.3% under the age of 18, 14.1% from 18 to 24, 26.0% from 25 to 44, 20.8% from 45 to 64, and 14.9% who were 65 years of age or older. The median age was 34 years. For every 100 females, there were 93.7 males. For every 100 females age 18 and over, there were 90.4 males.

The median income for a household in the city was $23,979, and for a family was $31,658. Males had a median income of $27,720 versus $19,575 for females. The per capita income for the city was $13,587. About 15.5% of families and 20.9% of the population were below the poverty line, including 22.3% of those under age 18 and 17.1% of those age 65 or over.

Education

Colleges and universities
Sul Ross State University began as a teachers' college in 1920, with its original campus in Alpine. Named for Lawrence Sullivan Ross, a Confederate States Army general during the American Civil War, Texas' 19th governor and later president of the new land grant college which became Texas A&M, it is now a member of the Texas State University System.

The 600-acre main campus on the lower slopes of Hancock Hill contains 20 or so buildings, most designed in Classical Revival style, and all harmoniously faced with red brick and white trim. The hillside gives fine views of the town below and the surrounding mountain ranges. The Bar-SR-Bar brand of the college is whitewashed on stones high above. In 1981, students placed a desk on Hancock Hill and today visitors are invited to hike up to "sign the register".

About 2,000 students attend here, many living in Lobo Village, which boasts 250 new apartment-style residence units. Both bachelor's and master's programs are available in fields such as behavioral and social sciences, business administration, computer science and mathematics, education, geology, law enforcement, and vocational nursing.

Sul Ross ranked number four in affordability among public universities according to U.S. News & World Report. It was included in "The Nation's 30 Most Attractive Yet Affordable Campuses", published by AffordableSchools.net, based on its combined qualities of affordability and the beauty of the campus and surrounding area.

Intercollegiate sports include men's and women's basketball, cross country, track and field, and tennis, along with men's baseball and women's softball, men's football and women's soccer, and women's volleyball. The teams are known as the Lobos, and play in the American Southwest Conference.

Sul Ross was the founding home of the National Intercollegiate Rodeo Association in 1949. The Sul Ross Rodeo Club competes in 10 NIRA rodeos each year. The NIRA rodeo hosted in Alpine is a big event for the school and the community.

Brewster County is within the Odessa College District for community college.

K–12 schools

Alpine Independent School District serves more than 1,000 local students attending Alpine Elementary School, Alpine Middle School, and Alpine High School, in classes from Pre-K, Kindergarten, and first through 12th grades.

On the Texas Education Agency report card for 2013–2014, the high school, with 277 students in grades 9–12, reached "Met Standard" overall, while receiving Distinction designations in mathematics, social studies, top 25% closing performance gaps, and postsecondary readiness. Notably, average class sizes in Alpine High are only about two-thirds the state average. The Middle School, with 309 students in grades 5–8, also reached "Met Standard", while receiving Distinction designations in mathematics and social Studies.

School colors are purple and old gold. The high school is home to the Alpine Fightin' Bucks and Lady Bucks. Sports include football, volleyball, cross-country, girls' basketball, boys' basketball, powerlifting, track and field, baseball, softball, golf, athletic training, and tennis. Alpine hosts the Big Bend Mountain Ramble, a "mile-high cross country meet, the highest race in Texas", as well as high-school and junior-high relays.

Alpine Montessori School is a private, nonsectarian, nonprofit school which serves grades pre-K through sixth.

Alpine Christian School is a nondenominational Christian school serving grades pre-K through 12.

Museum

The Museum of the Big Bend on the Sul Ross campus uses world-class exhibits of Native American artifacts, cultural history, geology, paleontology, and Western art to introduce the visitor to the Big Bend region. Subjects include the area's Indian tribes, the Buffalo soldiers, the mining era, the stagecoach, the railroad, and the history of Big Bend National Park. The overview includes historic photographs and short videos. The building was constructed in 1937 with local stone. Funding came from the Texas Centennial Commission and the Works Progress Administration, a federal make-work program during the Depression. Open Tuesday-Sunday, admission is free.

Media
In 1985 KVLF-AM, the only radio station licensed in Brewster County, was in Alpine. An individual quoted in a Federal Communications Commission report stated that in daylight hours it was possible to get radio from Fort Stockton, Texas.

The local daily paper is The Alpine Avalanche which has local news stories and advertisements, and it has almost no coverage of news outside of the area. Additionally Sul Ross students publish the Skyline and there is a resort sale publication called The Lajitas Sun. An FCC report in 1985 stated that while there was readership in the county for the San Angelo Standard Times and the Odessa American, "The two papers seldom carry articles covering the Alpine area."

Library
Begun by volunteers in 1947, the Alpine Public Library remains an independent entity with its own board of directors, though it is well-supported by the taxpayers of Brewster County and the City of Alpine. The community institution has a staff, with additional work done by volunteers. Special programs, like a science club and computer learning, are aimed at users from preschoolers and teens to parents and retirees.

The Alpine Public Library opened a facility in February, 2012, offering computer use with free Wi-Fi and access to online data, as well as traditional books, magazines, and other periodicals, CDs and DVDs, and a used bookstore, Re-Reads. Located at 805 W. Avenue E, it has a community meeting room, and is open Mon-Sat.

Hospital

Big Bend Regional Medical Center is a 25-bed facility. Inpatient and outpatient services are provided.

Sports
Alpine is home to the Alpine Cowboys independent baseball team. A member of the Pecos League, the Cowboys play their home games at Kokernot Field.
Alpine is also home to the high school football team the Alpine Fightin Bucks. The Bucks are a class 3A Division I high school football team.

Sites on National Register of Historic Places
The Brewster County Courthouse and Jail was built in 1887–1888 by Tom Lovett, a local contractor, who apparently designed the buildings, as well (documentation is scarce). Open to visitors, historic photographs are displayed in the great hall.

The red brick courthouse is a fine example of the American Second Empire Style. The rectangular mass has five bays of paired round-arch window openings on the longer north and south facades. The shorter east and west facades have three bays. On three facades, the center bay contains a doorway at ground level, set in a thin, barely protruding pavilion. The second-story windows are slightly taller than the first-floor openings, a trick of the eye making the two-and-a-half-story building seem even taller. The walls are topped by a pressed-tin entablature composed of a frieze and cornice. The mansard roof is marked by steeply hipped pyramidal towers with pressed-tin cresting. The interior retains exemplary pressed-tin ceilings and some original woodwork. A wooden staircase with Eastlake-type details rises to the general courtroom on the second floor.

The adjoining Brewster County Jail is distinguished by a crenelated brick parapet wall, suggesting "a fortress-like impregnability".

Attractions

Alpine makes a central base for exploring area attractions: the Big Bend National Park, Big Bend Ranch State Park, Fort Davis National Historic Site, Davis Mountains State Park with its Indian Lodge, the Chihuahuan Desert Nature Center and Botanical Gardens, and the McDonald Observatory, perched atop Mt Locke at 6,790 feet. Also worth visiting are Marathon with its iconic Gage Hotel; the historic hotel Limpia  of Fort Davis; Marfa with the Chinati Foundation Museum of Minimalist Art; the ghost town of Terlingua and the golf resort of Lajitas; and the River Road, FM 170, a 120-mile scenic route through the majestic Rio Grande Valley between Presidio and the Big Bend parks.

Attractions in, or close to, Alpine

Museum of the Big Bend has fun and informative displays, a children's corner, and a gift shop on the campus of Sul Ross State University, giving background information on sights in the Big Bend region.

Turner Range and Animal Science Center  hosts several rodeos and horse shows during the year at the covered S.A.L.E. Arena. At other times, students can be seen practicing their skills in the outdoor arena. The facility is near the main campus of Sul Ross.

Blue Creek Trail follows a scenic hiking path, mostly along dry stream channels, passing towering rocks of vivid earth tones. The first part is easy going, easy return, but the trail extends for many miles with greater challenges. Summer is hot, so take plenty of water, or hike in the fall, winter, or spring.

Arlington Southwest Cemetery, located 4 miles east of Alpine, is a memorial funded by the Big Bend Veterans for Peace. Each gravestone serves as a memorial for each individual soldier from Texas killed during the invasion and occupation of Iraq of the early 21st century.

Annual events

Texas Cowboy Poetry Gathering, usually late February, is a celebration of the oral tradition of working cowboys in poetry, song, and music.

Trappings of Texas, in April, is an exhibit and sale of custom gear and Western art held at the Museum of the Big Bend.

Big Bend Gem and Mineral Show, in April, is held at the Civic Center.

Cinco de Mayo includes a parade, enchilada dinner, music and dancing, car show, and Grand Mercado at Kokernot Field.

Alpine Cowboys professional baseball games take place at historic Kokernot Field.

Theater of the Big Bend, for over 50 years, this local theater troupe has performed various popular plays and musicals at the Kokernot Lodge outdoor amphitheater.

Fourth of July/Fiestas Barrios, July 4, parade, food, music, fireworks

Viva Big Bend music festival, in July, more than 50 bands play at venues from Marathon to Marfa, Fort Davis to Alpine.

Drive Big Bend has driving tours, music, parties, and a car show at Kokernot Field for antique, classic, and performance automobiles.

Big Bend Ranch Rodeo, in August, displays the skills of working cowboys (rather than rodeo professionals).

National Intercollegiate Rodeo

Big Bend Octane Fest, hosted by The Stable Performance Cars in early October. This weekend-long festival includes a car show, driving tours around the Big Bend, Marfa, Alpine, Fort Davis, and Marathon areas, auctions, and more, for antique, classic, and performance automobiles.

No Country For Old Men, in October, this bike race lists itself as "America's Premiere 1000 Mile Road Race".

ARTWALK, The weekend before Thanksgiving, art spills from the galleries onto the streets and Arbolitos Park, with chalk art on the sidewalks, live music, and a parade of flags.

Parade of Lights, December

Public art
A mural in the former post office at 109 West E St was painted as part of the New Deal public works programs during the Great Depression. Surviving murals from the project are found in 60 or so Texas cities and towns. Completed in 1940, this mural is by a Spanish-born and trained artist, Jose Moya del Pino, who was living and working in San Francisco. In the foreground, three figures recline on a rocky overlook (somewhat improbably, but this is art, not photography). They are each reading: a book, a magazine, and a tabloid newspaper, celebrating how the post office brings information and education to small towns and even cattle ranches. On the horizon, the Twin Sisters Mountain mark the location, with the town in the middle distance, including, at the behest of townspeople, the characteristic red-brick buildings of the Sul Ross State campus.

Popular culture
 J. Frank Dobie, the famed folklorist, author of Coronado's Children and more than 25 other books, taught at Alpine High School in 1910 and 1911 in his first job after graduating from Southwestern University in Georgetown, Texas.
 H. Allen Smith, the American humorist, author of Low Man on a Totem Pole, Rhubarb, and other bestsellers, as well as thousands of newspaper columns and magazine articles, retired to Alpine in 1967.
 Nelson Algren, novelist The Man with the Golden Arm, wrote his first story while working at a gas station in Alpine during the Depression (after graduating from the University of Illinois at Champaign-Urbana). He was caught stealing a typewriter from a classroom at Sul Ross to continue writing. The months he spent in jail deepened his identification with the losers and outsiders who were the characters of his later fiction.
 Trackdown, the CBS Western television series had "Alpine, Texas" as the title of its seventh episode.
It is the Texan setting of the film Gambit (M. Hoffman, 2012).
 Boyhood, the 2014 movie starring Ellar Coltrane, Patricia Arquette, Lorelei Linklater, and Ethan Hawke, featured places in and around Alpine. It received six Academy Award nominations. Nominated for five Golden Globe awards, it won Best Motion Picture-Drama, Best Director for Richard Linklater, and Best Supporting Actress for Patricia Arquette.
 The city is the home of lawyer Rod Ponton, notable for his 2021 widespread appearance, across social media and news outlets, with a Zoom cat face filter.

Post offices
 Alpine Post Office 103 N. 13th Street, Alpine, Texas 79830-9998
 Cpu Sul Ross Post Office 400 N Harrison Street, Alpine, Texas 79832-9991

Transportation
Alpine-Casparis Municipal Airport serves general aviation.
Amtrak's Sunset Limited long-distance train stops three times a week at the Alpine station on the former Southern Pacific Railroad's Sunset Line, the nation's second transcontinental route, now part of Union Pacific. Alpine is a crew change location for Union Pacific freight trains, making for constant activity along the tracks. In the past Alpine was also served by the Kansas City, Mexico and Orient Railway.
All Aboard America! operates intercity bus service from the KCS Quick Stop.
 US Highway 90.

In recent years, Alpine has served as an unofficial stop for bicyclists riding across the United States due to its location on the Adventure Cycling Association's Southern Tier Bicycle Route.

Notable people

 Carl W. Bauer, former Louisiana State Senator 
 Pete Gallego, former Texas State Senator and U.S. Representative 
 Joaquin Jackson, former Texas Ranger and actor
 Amanda Marcotte, feminist blogger for Slate and the Guardian
 Eric O'Keefe, author journalist editor
 Bake Turner, former NFL wide receive 
 John Coleman, founder of The Weather Channel and notable climate authority
 Fritz Kiersch, Film Director.  Most notable for directing the horror film Children of the Corn and the drama Tuff Turf.

References

External links

 City of Alpine
 Alpine Official Visitors Info
 Alpine Chamber of Commerce
 Sul Ross State University
 Alpine Area Parks
 Alpine Avalanche, local newspaper since 1892
 West Texas Weekly, local weekly newspaper

Cities in Texas
Cities in Brewster County, Texas
County seats in Texas
1882 establishments in Texas